

Cyneberht was a medieval Bishop of Lindsey.

Cyneberht was consecrated between 716 and 731. He died in 731. His death is recorded in the second continuation of the medieval chronicler Bede's Historia ecclesiastica gentis Anglorum under the year 732. He was also one of the informants for Bede's historical works, mainly for information about his diocese. Bede recorded Cyneberht's information as coming from "the most reverent Bishop Cyneberht".

Notes

Citations

References

External links
 

Bishops of Lindsey
731 deaths
Year of birth unknown